Planters National Bank, also known as the Old Planters Bank, is a historic bank building located in Richmond, Virginia.  It was built in 1893, and is a 2 1/2-story, three bay, Richardsonian Romanesque style brownstone building.  It has an "I"-plan with three intersecting gable roofs. It features rusticated and elaborately carved facades, a picturesque roof line, and stoned-arched entryway.

It was listed on the National Register of Historic Places in 1983.

References

Bank buildings on the National Register of Historic Places in Virginia
Romanesque Revival architecture in Virginia
Commercial buildings completed in 1893
Buildings and structures in Richmond, Virginia
National Register of Historic Places in Richmond, Virginia
1893 establishments in Virginia